"Thunderbird" is a song by hard rock musical act Call Me No One. The band released the song on August 7, 2012 as second single of their debut album Last Parade via ILG.

Charts

References

2012 singles
2012 songs
Songs written by Clint Lowery
Songs written by Morgan Rose
Alternative metal songs
American hard rock songs